I Wish is the debut studio album by American rapper Skee-Lo. It was released on June 27, 1995 via Sunshine/Scotti Bros. Records. The album was recorded and edited at Sunshine Studios in Hollywood, California. Production was handled by Walter "Kandor" Kahn and Skee-Lo, recorded and engineered by Todd Tracy. It features the guest appearances from Funky & Trend. The album peaked at number 53 on the Billboard 200 and number 37 on the Top R&B/Hip-Hop Albums, eventually achieving gold status by the Recording Industry Association of America on November 16, 1995 for sales of 500,000 copies in the United States. It was also nominated for a Grammy Award for Best Rap Album at the 38th Annual Grammy Awards.

Three months prior to the album's release, Skee-Lo's debut single, also titled "I Wish", was released independently on Sunshine Records. The song quickly became a hit, peaking at No. 13 on the Billboard Hot 100 and also receiving a gold certification by the RIAA and Grammy Award for Best Rap Solo Performance nomination.

The album's second single, "Top of the Stairs", released on October 30, 1995, was also a success, reaching #38 in the UK, #59 in Sweden and #112 in the US. The song later featured in Joseph Ruben's 1995 film Money Train soundtrack.

Music videos for both "I Wish" and "Top of the Stairs" were directed by Marty Thomas. The third single off of the album was "Superman", released on February 27, 1996 went non-charted.

Track listing

Personnel
Antoine "Skee-Lo" Roundtree – main artist, programming, producer, arranger
Jzahunn "Funky Trend" Echols – featured artist (track 9)
Danielle LaMette – backing vocals
Kimberly Poullard – backing vocals
Phyllis Roundtree – backing vocals
Michael Underwood – bass, guitar, keyboards, synthesizer
Todd Tracy – bass, guitar, assistant engineering
Rod Jones – bass, guitar, assistant programming
Andre Storey – bass, guitar
Craig Sharmat – bass, guitar
Amos Delone – keyboards, synthesizer, saxophone
Kenny B. – keyboards, synthesizer
Carl "Hazze" Gilkey – scratches
Archie L. Roundtree – assistant programming, management
Walter "Kandor" Kahn – producer, engineering, mixing
Colin Sauers – assistant engineering
Sven Holcomb – assistant engineering
Arnie Acosta – mastering
Doug Haverty – art direction
J-me Corrales – art direction
Command A Studios, Inc. – design
Johnny Buzzerio – photography

Charts

Certifications

References

External links

Jazz rap albums
1995 debut albums
Scotti Brothers Records albums
Hip hop albums by American artists